Kamamaung is a town in Hpapun District, Kayin State of Myanmar. According to 2014 Myanmar Census, the total population in Kamamaung is 20,895.

References 

Populated places in Kayin State